REPAIRtoire is a database of resources for systems biology of DNA damage and repair.

See also
 DNA repair

References

External links
 http://repairtoire.genesilico.pl

Biological databases
DNA repair
Systems biology